The General Elections Commission (abbreviated as KPU) is the body that organises elections in Indonesia. Its responsibilities include deciding which parties can contest elections, organising the voting and announcing the results and seats won in the various branches of the government.

History

Following the fall of President Suharto and the end of Indonesia's authoritarian New Order, as a result of public pressure, President Habibie brought forward the general elections planned for 2002 to 1999. On 1 February the People's Representative Council passed Law No.3/1999 on the General Election, which mandated the establishment of a "free and independent General Elections Commission comprising members of political parties and the government" to oversee the elections. The commission was then established with 53 members and former home affairs minister Rudini as chair. As a result of further public pressure, the government appointed five independent people as its representatives, including noted human rights lawyer Adnan Buyung Nasution. Other independent members included former Supreme Court judge Adi Andojo Soetjipto and political commentator  Andi Mallarangeng. The 1999 elections were held on 7 June, and were a success thanks to the management of the KPU, although 27 of the 48 parties contesting the election (all but one of which won less than 0.7% of the vote) refused to sign the KPU document reporting the results. The KPU passed the problem on to President Habibie, who declared the results valid on 26 July.

The second incarnation of the KPU was established on 11 April 2001 to organise the 2004 elections, but this time was made up of individuals from academia and NGOs. In 2007 the People's Representative Council (DPR) passed Law No. 22/2007, which stipulated that members of the KPU serve a five-year term. It also stated that members of the KPU would be chosen by a selection committee that together with the president would put forward a list of names to the DPR, which would conduct a fit and proper test. As a result of this process, which lasted from 21 to 30 August 2007, the initial 45 candidates were whittled down to 21, and a vote was taken by the DPR to decide on the final membership. The seven people chosen for the 2007–2012 term KPU were members of regional KPUs, academics, researchers and bureaucrats.

Headquarters
KPU central headquarters is located in a building on Jalan Imam Bonjol 29, Central Jakarta. The building, designed by architect A.W. Gmelig Meyling, was completed in 1955 and was among the first to be built in the post-war architecture style in Indonesia. It was described as "impressive" at its completion. The building was originally used for the office of the National Horticulture Centre of the Ministry of Agriculture.

KPU also has its local offices in all provinces, cities, and regencies throughout Indonesia except Aceh, where it took a name Independent Elections Commission (Komisi Independen Pemilihan or KIP) with its own structure and regulation.

Current membership
On 12 April 2022, President Joko Widodo, inaugurated members of KPU and Bawaslu for a term of 2022-2027. These are the current members (commissioners) of KPU:
 Hasyim Asy'ari (Chairman) 
 Betty Epsilon Idroos
 Mochammad Afifuddin
 Parsadaan Harahap
 Yulianto Sudrajat
 Idham Holik
 August Mellaz.

List of chairmen
 Rudini (1999–2001)
 Nazaruddin Sjamsuddin (2001–2005)
 Ramlan Surbakti (2005–2007, acting)
 Abdul Hafiz Anshari (2007–2012)
 Husni Kamil Manik (2012–2016)
 Hadar Nafis Gumay (2016, acting)
 Juri Ardiantoro (2016–2017)
 Arief Budiman (2017–2021, removed from office)
 Ilham Saputra (2021–2022)
 Hasyim Asy'ari (2022–present)

Organization Structure 

 Board of KPU Commissioners (including the Chairman of the KPU)
 Office of the Chairman of the KPU 
 General Secretariat of the KPU
 Deputy I (Administration Affairs)
 Bureau of Planning and Organization
 Division of Programs and Planning
 Subdivision of Planning System and Procedures
 Subdivision of Planning
 Subdivision of Programs and Plans Execution
 Division of Facilitation for Cooperation Administration  
 Subdivision of Facilitation for the Domestic Cooperation Administration 
 Subdivision of Facilitation for the International Cooperation Administration 
 Subdivision of Administration of the Bureau of Planning and Organization
 Division of Monitoring, Evaluation, and Reporting
 Subdivision of Monitoring
 Subdivision of Evaluation
 Subdivision of Reporting
 Division of Organization and Administration
 Subdivision of Organization
 Subdivision of Administration
 Bureau of Finance and State-owned Properties
 Division of Financial Information and Management
 Subdivision of Financial Information
 Subdivision of Electoral Finance Management
 Subdivision of Routine Finance Management
 Division of Treasury
 Subdivision of Salary and Debt Management  
 Subdivision of Treasury Guidance and Fostering
 Subdivision of Administration of the Bureau of Finance and State-owned Properties
 Division of State-owned Properties Management
 Subdivision of State-owned Properties Management I
 Subdivision of State-owned Properties Management II
 Subdivision of State-owned Properties Management III
 Division of Accountancy and Financial Reporting
 Subdivision of Accountancy and Financial Reporting I
 Subdivision of Accountancy and Financial Reporting II
 Subdivision of Accountancy and Financial Reporting III
 Bureau of General Affairs
 Division of House Affairs
 Subdivision of Office Infrastructures and Equipment
 Subdivision of Office Management and Services
 Subdivision of Official Travels and Transport Administration
 Division of Security
 Subdivision of Office and Official Residences Security
 Subdivision of KPU Officers Security and Internal Security 
 Division of Proceedings and Protocols
 Subdivision of Proceedings
 Subdivision of Protocols
 Subdivision of Administration of the Bureau of General Affairs
 Division of Letters and Leadership Administration
 Subdivision of Letters and Archives
 Subdivision of Chairman of the KPU and KPU Commissioners Administration 
 Subdivision of KPU General Secretariat Administration 
 Subdivision of Deputy I Administration 
 Subdivision of Deputy II Administration 
 Bureau of Human Resources
 Division of Employee Administration
 Subdivision of Employee Planning and Procurement
 Subdivision of Employee Mutation and Pension
 Subdivision of Employee Data Management
 Division of Employee Performance and Welfare
 Subdivision of Employee Performance 
 Subdivision of Employee Discipline Enforcement
 Subdivision of Employee Rewards and Welfare
 Division of Employee Career Development
 Subdivision of Structural Career Tracks Planning and Development
 Subdivision of Functionaries Career Tracks Planning and Development
 Subdivision of Administration of the Bureau of Human Resources
 Division of KPU Members and Ad-hoc Bodies Administration 
 Subdivision of KPU Members and Ad-hoc Bodies Administration I
 Subdivision of KPU Members and Ad-hoc Bodies Administration II
 Subdivision of KPU Members and Ad-hoc Bodies Administration III
 Deputy II (Technical Support)
 Bureau of Technical Support for Electoral Organizers
 Division of Ballots Design, Documentation, Electoral Regions, and Chairs Allocation
 Subdivision of Ballots Design and Documentation 
 Subdivision of Electoral Regions
 Subdivision of Chairs Allocation
 Division of Election Participants Management
 Subdivision of Employee Performance 
 Subdivision of Employee Discipline Enforcement
 Subdivision of Employee Rewards and Welfare
 Division of Employee Career Development
 Subdivision of DPR and DPRD Candidacy and Interim Replacement
 Subdivision of Presidential and Vice-Presidential Candidacy and DPD Candidacy and Interim Replacement
 Subdivision of Political Parties
 Division of Voting, Vote Counting, and Vote Count Results Recapitulation
 Subdivision of Voting and Vote Counting
 Subdivision of Vote Count Results Recapitulation
 Subdivision of Establishment of Election Results
 Bureau of Logistics
 Division of Election Logistics Management
 Subdivision of Planning and Data Management for Election Logistics 
 Subdivision of Preparation for Procurement of Election Logistics
 Subdivision of Maintenance and Inventory of Election Logistics
 Division of Goods and Services Procurement
 Subdivision of Goods and Services Procurement
 Subdivision of Goods and Services Procurement Information System
 Subdivision of Goods and Services Procurement Guidance and Fostering
 Division of Election Logistics Reporting and Documentation
 Subdivision of Reporting
 Subdivision of Documentation
 Subdivision of Administration of the Bureau of Election Logistics Reporting and Documentation
 Bureau of Law Advocation and Dispute Resolution
 Division of Advocation and Legal Opinion
 Subdivision of Advocation
 Subdivision of Legal Opinion
 Subdivision of Administration of the Bureau of Law Advocation and Dispute Resolution
 Bureau of Legal Affairs
 Subdivision of Administration of the Bureau of Legal Affairs
 Bureau of Public Participation and Public Relations
 Division of Voters Education
 Subdivision of Direct Socialization and Voters Education
 Subdivision of Indirect Socialization and Voters Education by Media
 Subdivision of Socialization and Voters Education Material and Management
 Division of Public Relations and Public Information
 Subdivision of Public Relations and Book Affairs
 Subdivision of Public Information and Social Media
 Subdivision of Coverage and Public Relations Documentation
 Division of Inter-institutional Relations
 Subdivision of Inter-governmental Bodies Relations
 Subdivision of Non-governmental Bodies and Community Bodies Relations
 Subdivision of Administration of the Bureau of Public Participation and Public Relations
 General Inspectorate
 Inspectorate I
 Inspectorate II
 Inspectorate III
 Division of the General Inspectorate Administration
 Subdivision of Planning and General Affairs
 Subdivision of Facilitation of Auditors
 Subdivision of Evaluation and Information of Investigation Follow-up
 Center for Education, Research, and Development
 Division of Education, Research, and Development Administration and General Affairs
 Division of Planning, Monitoring, Evaluation, and Reporting
 Division of Education
 Division of Research, and Development
 Center for Data and Information
 Division of Data and Information Administration and General Affairs
 Division of Data and Information
 Division of IT Infrastructures
 Division of Applications and IT Managements
 Provincial KPU Secretariats
 Cities/Regencies KPU Secretariats

See also
 General Election Supervisory Agency
 Elections in Indonesia

References

Notes

Government agencies of Indonesia
Elections in Indonesia
Politics of Indonesia
Indonesia